Oussou Konan Anicet Harian Maxmalon (23 January 1989 – 3 January 2022) was an Ivorian professional footballer who played as a forward.

Career
Anicet started his career at Africa Sports, a club in his home town Abidjan, before moving to Tunisia in 2008 to join Espérance Sportive de Tunis, with which he signed for five years. After a half year loan spell with Stade Tunisien from Espérance Sportive de Tunis, he joined on 27 August 2009 AS Marsa on loan. He subsequently signed a three-year contract with the Egyptian club Al Ahly.

Personal life and death
Anicet died from a sudden illness on 3 January 2022, at the age of 32.

References

1989 births
2022 deaths
Footballers from Abidjan
Ivorian footballers
Ivorian expatriate footballers
Association football forwards
Africa Sports d'Abidjan players
Espérance Sportive de Tunis players
Stade Tunisien players
AS Marsa players
Misr Lel Makkasa SC players
Al Ahly SC players
Hajer FC players
Gaziantep F.K. footballers
Helsingin Jalkapalloklubi players
Tala'ea El Gaish SC players
Saham SC players
CA Bizertin players
FC San-Pédro players
FC Stade Lausanne Ouchy players
Al-Bukayriyah FC players
Ligue 1 (Ivory Coast) players
Tunisian Ligue Professionnelle 1 players
Egyptian Premier League players
Saudi Professional League players
Süper Lig players
Veikkausliiga players
Oman Professional League players
Swiss Challenge League players
V.League 1 players
Saudi Second Division players
Expatriate footballers in Tunisia
Expatriate footballers in Egypt
Expatriate footballers in Saudi Arabia
Expatriate footballers in Turkey
Expatriate footballers in Finland
Expatriate footballers in Oman
Expatriate footballers in Switzerland
Expatriate footballers in Vietnam
Ivorian expatriate sportspeople in Tunisia
Ivorian expatriate sportspeople in Egypt
Ivorian expatriate sportspeople in Saudi Arabia
Ivorian expatriate sportspeople in Turkey
Ivorian expatriate sportspeople in Finland
Ivorian expatriate sportspeople in Oman
Ivorian expatriate sportspeople in Switzerland
Ivorian expatriate sportspeople in Vietnam